The Haiti national basketball team (French: Équipe nationale du basket-ball du Haiti)   represents Haiti in men's international basketball competitions, It is administrated by the Haitian Basketball Federation., The team has never participated in the Olympics or World Cup.

Roster
2018 Squad:

Depth chart

Notable players
Other current notable players from Haiti or of Haitian descent:

International competitions

Olympic Games 
No appearances

FIBA World Cup
No appearances

FIBA AmeriCup
No appearances

Pan American Games
 1971: 12th place

Centrobasket championship
 1975: 1st place
 1981: 1st place

References

External links 

 FHB official website
 Haiti at the FIBA website
 Haiti at CBC website
 Presentation on Facebook

Basketball in Haiti
Men's national basketball teams
Basketball
1970 establishments in Haiti